The 2011 Internationaler Apano Cup was a professional tennis tournament played on clay courts. It was the first edition of the tournament which was part of the 2011 ATP Challenger Tour. It took place in Dortmund, Germany between 25 and 31 July 2011.

ATP entrants

Seeds

 1 Rankings are as of July 18, 2011.

Other entrants
The following players received wildcards into the singles main draw:
  Nils Langer
  Daniel Masur
  Marvin Netuschil
  Nicolas Reissig

The following players received entry from the qualifying draw:
  Maxime Authom
  André Ghem
  Maxime Teixeira
  Nick van der Meer

The following players received entry from the qualifying draw as a lucky loser:
  Marco Trungelliti

Champions

Singles

 Leonardo Mayer def.  Thomas Schoorel, 6–3, 6–2

Doubles

 Dominik Meffert /  Björn Phau def.  Teymuraz Gabashvili /  Andrey Kuznetsov, 6–4, 6–3

External links
Official website
ITF Search 
ATP official site

Internationaler Apano Cup
Clay court tennis tournaments
Tennis tournaments in Germany